Svetlana Aleksandrovna Masterkova (born 17 January 1968) is a Russian former middle-distance runner and former women's world record holder for the mile and the current 1000 metres world record world record. At the 1996 Summer Olympics, she won the gold medal in both the 800 metres and 1500 metres.

Career
Born in Achinsk (Siberia), Started out as an 800 metres runner. She first appeared internationally at the 1985 European Athletics Junior Championships, taking 6th place in the 800 metres. Her breakthrough came in 1991, winning the national championships of the Soviet Union, which also qualified her for the World Championships. In Tokyo, she placed eighth in the final. During the following seasons, she had some minor successes (silver at the IAAF World Indoor Championships in 1993), but also suffered from injuries. In 1994 and 1995, she took a break from running, giving birth to a daughter (Anastasia).

In 1996, she returned to athletics. Instead of only running the 800 m, also decided to compete in the 1500 metres, a distance she had not competed in four years. At the Russian Championships, she won both distances in top times. However, she was not considered as a real favourite for the 800 m Olympic gold; Maria Mutola and Ana Fidelia Quirot were  expected to fight for the title in Atlanta. Took the lead from the start, and led the entire race to become Olympic champion. After this surprise, caused a major upset by also winning the 1500 m in a similar fashion, thereby equaling Tatyana Kazankina's performance at the 1976 Olympics (Kelly Holmes would repeat the performance in 2004). She completed her season by also setting two new world records at the 1000 metre and mile distances.

Was not able to repeat her feat at the World Championships the next year, as an achilles tendon injury caused her to drop out in the heats of the 1500 metres. Her 1998 season was great again, crowned by a win in the 1500 m at the European Championships. At the 1999 World championships, Again contested both middle distance events. She won bronze in the 800 m won by Ludmila Formanová but comprehensively won the 1500 metres title. This would be her last major success. Although participated in the Sydney Olympics, she abandoned her 1500 metres heat.  She announced her retirement at Znamensky Indoor stadium on 7 January 2003.

Personal life
Svetlana married Russian professional road racing cyclist Asiat Saitov in 1994. Their daughter Anastasiya Saitova is a professional tennis player, taking her first singles title in Sharm El Sheikh and ranked number 511 in the world in 2014.

Records

Honours and awards
Order of Merit for the Fatherland, 3rd class (26 August 1996) - for services to the State and outstanding achievements in sport
Honoured Master of Sports of Russia
IAAF World Athlete of the Year (1996)
European Sportsperson of the Year (1996)

See also
List of Olympic medalists in athletics (women)
List of 1996 Summer Olympics medal winners
List of World Athletics Championships medalists (women)
List of IAAF World Indoor Championships medalists (women)
List of European Athletics Championships medalists (women)
List of European Athletics Indoor Championships medalists (women)
List of Russian sportspeople
800 metres at the Olympics
1500 metres at the Olympics
800 metres at the World Championships in Athletics
1500 metres at the World Championships in Athletics

References

1968 births
Living people
People from Achinsk
Sportspeople from Krasnoyarsk Krai
Russian female middle-distance runners
Olympic female middle-distance runners
Olympic athletes of Russia
Olympic gold medalists for Russia
Olympic gold medalists in athletics (track and field)
Athletes (track and field) at the 1996 Summer Olympics
Athletes (track and field) at the 2000 Summer Olympics
Medalists at the 1996 Summer Olympics
Goodwill Games medalists in athletics
Competitors at the 1998 Goodwill Games
World Athletics Championships athletes for Russia
World Athletics Championships medalists
World Athletics Championships winners
IAAF Continental Cup winners
European Athletics Championships winners
European Athletics Championships medalists
Soviet Athletics Championships winners
Russian Athletics Championships winners
European Athlete of the Year winners
Track & Field News Athlete of the Year winners
World Athletics record holders
Recipients of the Order "For Merit to the Fatherland", 3rd class